Queen Inwon (3 November 1687 – 13 May 1757; 인원왕후 김씨), of the Gyeongju Kim clan, was a posthumous name bestowed to the wife and fourth queen consort of Yi Sun, King Sukjong, the 19th Joseon monarch. She was queen consort of Joseon from 1702 until her husband's death in 1720. She was honoured as Queen Dowager Hyesun  (혜순왕대비) during the reign of her step-son Yi Yun, King Gyeongjong, and later as Grand Queen Dowager Hyesun (혜순대왕대비) during the reign of her adoptive son, Yi Geum, King Yeongjo.

Biography

Early life 
Born on 3 November 1687 during the thirteenth year of the reign of King Sukjong, the future queen was the second daughter of Kim Ju-shin, entitled as Internal Prince Gyeongeun (경은부원군), and his wife, Internal Princess Consort Garim (가림부부인) of the Imcheon Jo clan. She had one older sister, a younger sister, and two younger brothers.

Marriage and palace life 
The 15 year old Lady Kim married King Sukjong on 3 October 1702, following the death of Queen Inhyeon and the execution of Jang Hui-bin in 1701. Technically, she was Sukjong's fourth queen consort, but is officially recorded as the third queen consort of King Sukjong. Jang Ok-jeong was the actual third queen consort, but was ousted upon Queen Inhyeon's reinstatement.

In 1703, she adopted Royal Noble Consort Suk’s son, Prince Yeoning, who was known to be her favorite and whom she regarded as her own son. In 1711, she came down with smallpox. Choi Suk-bin ordered the gungnyeo to go out of the palace and look for remedies among the commoners to save the Queen, who in the end survived.

Life as queen dowager 
Following Sukjong's death in 1720, she was honoured as Queen Dowager Hyesun (혜순왕대비). Although her family was Soron, she changed her faction to Noron after Sukjong's death. King Gyeongjong suffered ill health and was unable to produce an heir—or to do much of anything for that matter. During his reign, the Noron and Soron factions battled for power. The Soron faction were the ruling political faction and supported Gyeongjong, and the Noron faction supported his half-brother, Prince Yeoning. The Noron faction and his step-mother, Queen Dowager Hyesun pressured him to appointed Prince Yeoning as his heir. 

According to one theory, Queen Seonui opposed Prince Yeoning and planned secretly to adopt Prince Milpung (밀풍군, Milpung-Kun), a great-grandson of Crown Prince Sohyeon, King Injo's first son. Two months after the King's enthronement, Prince Yeoning was installed as Crown Prince Successor (Wangseje, 왕세제, 王世弟).

Following the death of her step-son, King Gyeongjong, and the accession of her adoptive son, King Yeongjo, in 1724, she was honoured as Grand Queen Dowager Hyesun (혜순대왕대비).

It’s said that during her time in the palace, Queen Dowager Hyesun wrote 3 books: Syeongyun Yusa (션균유사), Syeonbi Yusa (션비유사), and Neok Ayukjang (뉵아육장).

Later life 
During King Yeongjo’s reign, the Queen Dowager received filial piety from her adopted son and his wife, Queen Jeongseong.

On 3 April 1757, her adoptive daughter-in-law Queen Jeongseong had died at the age of 64 within Changdeok Palace.

A month later, the Queen Dowager later died on 3 May 1757 in the thirty-third year reign of King Yeongjo at Changdeok Palace, aged 69. She is buried in Myeongreung in Goyang city, Gyeonggi Province, near the tombs of King Sukjong and his second queen consort, Queen Inhyeon.

She was posthumously honored as Queen Inwon (인원왕후, 仁元王后).

King Yeongjo’s son, Crown Prince Sado, from Royal Consort Yeong, had been said to have grieved immensely; causing his mental illness to worsen. This was because the crown prince was close to his legal grandmother, Queen Inwon, and legal mother, Queen Jeongseong.

His actions eventually caused him to die in a rice chest in 1762; five years after the queen's death.

Family 

Parent

 Father − Internal Prince Gyeongeun, Kim Ju-shin (경은부원군 김주신, 慶恩府院君 金柱臣) (1661 - 1721)
 1) Grandfather − Kim Il-jin (김일진, 金一振)(1633 - 1665)
 2) Great-Grandfather − Kim Nam-jong (김남중, 金南重) (1596 - 1663)
 3) Great-Great-Grandfather − Kim Su-ryeom (김수렴, 金守廉) (1574 - 1651)
 4) Great-Great-Great-Grandfather − Kim Myeong-won (김명원, 金命元) (1534 - 13 December 1602)
 5) Great-Great-Great-Great-Grandfather − Kim Man-gyun (김만균, 金萬鈞)
 6) Great-Great-Great-Great-Great-Grandfather − Kim Cheon-ryeong (김천령, 金千齡)
 5) Great-Great-Great-Great-Grandmother − Lady Ahn of the Sunheung Ahn clan (순흥 안씨)
 4) Great-Great-Great-Grandmother − Lady Han of the Cheongju Han clan (청주 한씨)
 3) Great-Great-Grandmother − Lady Seong of the Changnyeong Seong clan (정경부인 창녕 성씨, 貞敬夫人 昌寧 成氏) (1567 - 1648)
 2) Great-Grandmother − Lady Yi of the Jeonju Yi clan (전주 이씨, 全州 李氏); Kim Nam-jong's second wife
 2) Step Great-Grandmother − Lady Min of the Yeoheung Min clan (여흥 민씨); Kim Nam-jong's first wife
 1) Grandmother − Lady Jo the Pungyang Jo clan (증 정경부인 풍양 조씨, 孺人 贈 貞敬夫人 豊壤 趙氏) (1633–1685)
 Mother − Internal Princess Consort Garim of the Imcheon Jo clan (가림부부인 임천 조씨, 嘉林府夫人 林川 趙氏) (1660–1731)
 1) Grandmother − Lady Yi of the Hansan Yi clan (한산 이씨, 韓山 李氏)
 1) Grandfather − Jo Kyeong-chang (조경창, 趙景昌) (1634 - 1694)

Sibling

 Older sister − Lady Kim of the Gyeongju Kim clan 
 Brother-in-law − Yi Deok-rin (이덕린, 李德鄰)
 Younger sister − Lady Kim of the Gyeongju Kim clan (증 정부인 경주 김씨, 贈 貞夫人 慶州 金氏)
 Brother-in-law − Yun Myeon-gyu (윤면교, 尹勉敎) (1691 - 1766)
 Younger brother − Kim Hu-yeon (김후연, 金後衍) (1694 - 1735)
 Sister-in-law − Lady Yun of the Haepyeong Yun clan (해평 윤씨, 海平 尹氏)
 Younger brother − Kim Gu-yeon (김구연, 金九衍) (1699 - 1743)
 Sister-in-law − Lady Park of the Bannam Park clan (반남 박씨, 潘南 朴氏)
 Younger half-brother − Kim Ga-yeon (김가연, 金可衍) (1703 - ?)
 Half sister-in-law − Lady Seong of the Changnyeong Seong clan (창녕 성씨, 昌寧 成氏)
 Younger half-brother − Kim Nae-yeon (김내연, 金乃衍) (1708 - ?)
 Half sister-in-law − Lady Kyeong of the Cheongju Kyeong clan (청주 경씨, 淸州 慶氏)
Younger half-sister − Lady Kim of the Gyeongju Kim clan
 Half brother-in-law − Gu Hong-jwa (구홍좌, 具弘佐)

Consort

 Husband − Yi Sun, King Sukjong (숙종대왕) (1661–1720) 
 Father-in-law − Yi Yeon, King Hyeonjeong (현종대왕) (1641–1674)
 Mother-in-law − Queen Myeongseong of the Cheongpung Kim clan (명성왕후 김씨) (1642–1684)
 Sister-in-law − Princess Myeongseon (명선공주) (1659–1673)
 Sister-in-law − Princess Myeonghye (명혜공주) (1662–1673)
 Sister-in-law − Yi On-hui, Princess Myeongan (명안공주) (1665–1687)

Issue

 Adoptive son − Yi Geum, King Yeongjo (영조대왕) (1694–1776)

Full posthumous name 
She was given the posthumous title 
Queen Inwon, Hyesun Jagyeong Heonryeol Gwangseon Hyeonik Kangseong Jeongdeok Suchang Yeongbok Yunghwa Hwijeong Jeongwoon Jeongui Jangmok Inwon Wanghu
혜순자경헌렬광선현익강성정덕수창영복융화휘정정운정의장목인원왕후 
惠順慈敬獻烈光宣顯翼康聖貞德壽昌永福隆化徽精正運定懿章穆仁元王后.

In popular culture
Portrayed by Kang Boo-ja in the 1988 MBC TV series 500 Years of Joseon: Memoirs of Lady Hyegyeong.
Portrayed by Kim Yong-rim in the 1998 MBC TV series The Great's King Road
Portrayed by Oh Yeon-seo in the 2010 MBC TV series Dong Yi.
 Portrayed by Kim Hae-sook in the 2015 film The Throne.
 Portrayed by Nam Ki-ae in the 2019 SBS TV series Haechi.

References

1687 births
1757 deaths
Royal consorts of the Joseon dynasty
Korean queens consort
18th-century Korean women
People from Seoul